Citrus Ridge may refer to:
A former name for Four Corners, Florida, an unincorporated area in Lake, Orange, Osceola, and Polk Counties
Citrus Ridge, Indian River County, Florida, located along State Road 60 west of Vero Beach, and including a post office